Denis Aleksandrovich Kazionov (born 8 December 1987) is a Russian former professional ice hockey winger. His career, which lasted from 2003 to 2020, was mainly spent in the Kontinental Hockey League. His brother Dmitri also played professionally.

He was selected by the Tampa Bay Lightning in the 7th round (198th overall) of the 2006 NHL Entry Draft.

References

External links

1987 births
Living people
Amur Khabarovsk players
Atlant Moscow Oblast players
Avangard Omsk players
Avtomobilist Yekaterinburg players
HC Izhstal players
BK Mladá Boleslav players
HC Dinamo Minsk players
HC MVD players
HC Neftekhimik Nizhnekamsk players
HC Sochi players
Metallurg Magnitogorsk players
Metallurg Novokuznetsk players
Russian ice hockey left wingers
Sportspeople from Perm, Russia
Severstal Cherepovets players
HC Shakhtyor Soligorsk players
SK Horácká Slavia Třebíč players
Torpedo Nizhny Novgorod players
Traktor Chelyabinsk players
Russian expatriate sportspeople in Belarus
Russian expatriate sportspeople in the Czech Republic
Expatriate ice hockey players in the Czech Republic
Expatriate ice hockey players in Belarus
Russian expatriate ice hockey people